Silverstein is a surname. Notable people with the surname include:

Abe Silverstein (1908–2001), American NASA aerospace engineer
Alan Silverstein, American rabbi
Charles Silverstein (born 1935), American writer and magazine editor
Debra Silverstein, American politician
Duane Silverstein, American environmentalist
Elliot Silverstein (born 1927), American director
Eva Silverstein, American physicist and string theorist
Ira Silverstein (born 1960), American politician, state representative in Illinois
Jake Silverstein (born 1975), American magazine editor
Jamie Silverstein (born 1983), American figure skater
Joseph Silverstein (born 1932), American violinist and orchestra conductor
Keith Silverstein (born 1970), American voice actor
Ken Silverstein, American magazine editor and blogger
Larry Silverstein (born 1932), American real estate investor, leaseholder of the World Trade Center towers
Louis Silverstein (1919–2011), American artist and graphic designer
Martin J. Silverstein (born 1954), American attorney and diplomat
Matt Silverstein, American television writer
Max Silverstein (1911–1942), American military officer 
Michael Silverstein (1945–2020), American anthropological linguist
Murray Silverstein, American architect and philologist
Rich Silverstein, American businessperson
Ruffy Silverstein (American wrestler) (1914–1980), American wrestler
Ruffy Silverstein (Canadian wrestler) (born 1972), Canadian wrestler 
Shel Silverstein (1930–1999), American author, poet and cartoonist of children’s books
Thomas Silverstein (1952–2019), American criminal; murderer incarcerated since 1975

Jewish surnames
Yiddish-language surnames